Midnight Café is the third studio album by the English rock band Smokie, released in April 1976.

Track listing

"I'll Meet You At Midnight" is the 12th track on the 2007 and 2016 remastered editions, lifting "Train Song" and "The Loser" up to 10-11, and bumping the remaining bonus tracks to 13-16.

Personnel
Credits are adapted from the album's 1976 and 2016 liner notes.
Smokie
Chris Norman – lead vocals, back vocals, acoustic guitars, electric guitars, piano
Alan Silson – lead guitar, back vocals, acoustic guitars, lead vocals (on "What Can I Do")
Terry Uttley – bass guitar, back vocals
Pete Spencer – drums, percussion, back vocals

Technical personnel
Mike Chapman – production
Nicky Chinn – production
Pete Coleman – engineering
Chris Blair – mastering (at Abbey Road Studios, London, England)
Jimmie Haskell – string arrangements (on tracks 1-4, 6 and 9)
Michael Ross – sleeve design
Gered Mankowitz – photography

Remastering
Tim Turan at Turan Audio – 2007 remastering
MM Sound Digital Mastering Studios – 2016 remastering

Charts

Weekly charts

Year-end charts

References
Notes
"What Can I Do" was recorded at Audio International Studios (London, England).

Citations

External links
Discography 1975-1982

Smokie (band) albums
1976 albums
Rak Records albums
Albums produced by Mike Chapman